Dayang Kalangitan (Baybayin: ᜃᜎᜅᜒᜆᜈ᜔ , Abecedario: Cálan͠gúitán) (r. 1450–ca. 1515) is a legendary figure in early Philippine history who was said to be Dayang of the pre-Hispanic Indianized polity of Pasig. She was co-regent of Pasig with her husband, Rajah Lontok, and later sole ruler of their realms. She is one of the very few known female leaders in precolonial Philippine history.

She ruled Pasig from her seat of power in Bitukang Manók. Her children are Dayang Panginoan, Dayang Lahat, Rajah Salalila of Maynila and Gat Kahiya.

Life
Dayang Kalangitan was married to Gat Lontok, (later Rajah Lontok) of Tondo. Together with her husband, Kalangitan established a small kingdom upstream to the east of Tondo around the Bitukang Manók (today Parian Creek in Pasig).

Sometime around 1450, she became sole ruler of both Tondo, which included Bitukang Manók, the place she had established with her husband. In order to consolidate power, her daughter Dayang Panginoan, was married to Prince Balagtas, the son of Empress Sasaban of Namayan.

However, at around 1500, the Sultanate of Brunei made an attack on the Kingdom of Tondo and established the Kingdom of Maynila and put Kalangitan's son, Salalila as the monarch of Maynila.

Dayang Kalangitan's son Salalila succeeded her as monarch; after converting to Islam, he adopted his more famous name, Sulaiman.

Tondo and Maynila became separate kingdoms after Salalila. Tondo was ruled by Salalila's eldest son, Lakan Dula and Maynila by Rajah Matanda and Rajah Sulayman. Namayan came under the rule of Rajah Kalamayin.

In popular media

Literature
 Kalangitan is a novel written by A.F. Eleazar. The plot revolves around a princess named Kalangitan, who became the Queen regnant of Namayan, Tondo, and on her realm at Bitukang Manok, which is the seat of power. As described on the novel, Kalangitan is the most powerful woman in the Maisung at the time of her reign. The novel tackled the history of pre-Hispanic Philippines and the tradition of monogamy, justice system, culture and social norms. The main gist of the novel is about feminism during the pre-colonial era as it shows on the way it was written. It also explore the genre of Philippine mythology, epic and legends. It also contains allegories and sublimal messages as seen on the succeeding chapters of the book. The story was set in Manila during 1450 AD.

See also
List of ancient Philippine consorts
Pasig
Namayan
Barangay state

References

Filipino datus, rajas and sultans
History of the Philippines (900–1565)
15th-century women rulers
16th-century women rulers